Sew Ditch is a minor,  long river—brook—and drainage ditch of the Pevensey Levels in Hailsham, Wealden District of East Sussex, England. It rises from Kentland Sewer and flows southerly into Burgh Fleet and Monkham Sewer.

References 

Rivers of East Sussex
Rivers of the Pevensey Levels